Science Olympiad is an American team competition in which students compete in 23 events pertaining to various fields of science, including earth science, biology, chemistry, physics, and engineering. Over 7,800 middle school and high school teams from 50 U.S. states compete each year. U.S. territories do not compete; however, since 2012 high school teams from Japan have competed at the national tournament as unranked guests.

There are multiple levels of competition: invitational, regional, state, and national. Invitational tournaments, run by high schools and universities, are unofficial tournaments and serve as practice for regional and state competitions. Teams that excel at regional competitions advance to the state level; the top one or two teams from each state (depending on the state) then advance the national level. Winners later receive several kinds of awards, including medals, trophies and plaques, as well as scholarships. The program for elementary-age students is less common and consistent.  Schools have flexibility to implement the program to meet their needs.  Some communities host competitive elementary tournaments.

Science Olympiad is not associated with the International Science Olympiads, which is a group of science competitions with their own rules and objectives.

History

The first recorded Science Olympiad was held on Saturday, November 23, 1974 at St. Andrews Presbyterian College in Laurinburg, North Carolina. Dr.  Barnes and Dr. David Wetmore were the originators of this event. Fifteen schools from North and South Carolina participated in this event.  It was a day-long affair, with competitions and demonstrations for high school students in the areas of biology, chemistry, and physics. There were four event periods during this day and each event period had one fun event (like beaker race or paper airplane), one demonstration (like glassblowing and holography), and one serious event (like periodic table quiz or Science Bowl). An article by David Wetmore was published in the Journal of Chemical Education in January 1978 documenting the success of recruiting students through Science Olympiad. St. Andrews Presbyterian College continues to host a Science Olympiad tournament to this day. Mr. John C. "Jack" Cairns was a teacher at Dover High School in Delaware when he learned about the Science Olympiad tournament in North Carolina. He shared this information with Dr. Douglas R. Macbeth, the Delaware State Science Supervisor. Mr. Cairns was appointed to a steering committee to organize the first Science Olympiad in Delaware which took place at Delaware State University in the Spring of 1977.  A write-up in The Science Teacher of December 1977 caught the attention of Gerard Putz, who proposed that the program be expanded throughout the United States. After competition tests in Michigan at the Lawrence Institute of Technology and Oakland University in 1983 and 1984, Putz and Delaware director John Cairns took their plan for a national competition to the National Science Teachers Conference in Boston. The first National Tournament was attended by representatives of 17 states, held at Michigan State University in 1985. Since then, the program has expanded greatly, with 60 teams present in each division at the National Tournament.  In 2012, a Global Ambassador Team from Japan was invited to attend the national tournament at the University of Central Florida. Japan continues to send a team, as of the 2019 National Tournament.

Divisions
There are three divisions in the hierarchy of Science Olympiad:

 Division A for elementary school (grades K–6)
 Division B for middle school (grades 6–9)
 Division C for high school (grades 9–12)

The national tournament and generally state and regional tournaments are only for divisions B and C. Division A teams usually have separate interscholastic tournaments, apart from the more common intra-school competitions. Note that 6th and 9th graders have the option of competing in either of the two divisions in which they meet the grade requirements and are part of the competing school. A middle school may, however, only use up to 5 members who have graduated to the next school if they are in 9th grade or lower. Students in grades lower than the division in which the school competes in may also be on the team. Teams are restricted to five 9th graders for division B and seven 12th graders for division C. Students may not participate on multiple teams, e.g. a 9th grader on both a high school and middle school team would not be allowed.

Events and event history
In Divisions B and C, teams may compete in up to twenty-three main events, which usually occur over a single day (some tournaments, such as the Texas State tournament, run competitive events over multiple days); done by a team of no more than 15 members.  Events fall into five main categories: Life, Personal, and Social Science, Earth & Space Science, Physical Science & Chemistry, Technology & Engineering, Inquiry & Nature of Science.  They are either knowledge-based (for example, written tests on earth science, physics, astronomy, or biology), hands-on (for example, chemistry lab practicals or events involving both device testing and an exam), or engineering-based (participants construct a device before the competition to do specified tasks on the day of the competition).

Knowledge-based events generally have two participants taking a test and/or mathematically analyzing data. Examples of such events are Anatomy and Physiology, Meteorology, and Remote Sensing.

Hands-on events generally consist of two participants performing experiments or interacting with physical objects to achieve a certain goal. Some examples are Forensics, Experimental Design, and Hovercraft.

Engineering-based events have a team of two to three participants. They are to construct a device following a specific event's parameters and test the device against others. Examples include Battery Buggy, Towers, and Mission Possible.

The majority of events allow two team members, though a few allow more.  If one member is unable to attend an event, the other is able to continue, depending on the event, with the competition, though at an obvious disadvantage. If the team has one available, a backup team member may be placed with the member as opposed to their former partner.

The list and rules for events change and are updated every year to input dynamism and to limit the advantages of more experienced teams.

States have substantial leeway in how they run their organization; several states, notably North Carolina and Texas, run altered slates of events; in the case of Texas, teams can choose to replace National events with state-exclusive events.

2017–2018 events

2015–2016 events

Trial/pilot events
Trial/Pilot events are, at Regional and State tournaments, events that are specific to that state that are being considered as events for the next year. At Regionals and States, these events may count towards the team's score. At Nationals, however, there is a completely different set of Trial/Pilot events, sometimes known as "alternate events" because the people entering them do not have to be on the official team. These do not count towards the team's score, but ribbons and medals are usually awarded.

Distinction between trial and pilot events
The terms "trial event" and "pilot event" (also called "exploratory event") are sometimes interchangeable, both pertaining to an event that is not an official, national event for the year. However, at the National Tournament, there are often two differences. First, in 2010, it was announced that medals would only be awarded to the top 3 in the Trial events, but not at all in the Pilot events.  Also, the Trial event are often much closer to becoming official events for following years than pilot events. Almost all of the Trial events from recent National tournaments have become official events within a few years of the tournament, while the same is not true for almost any of the pilot events.

Team structure
Teams are hosted by the school from which the participants attend. Science Olympiad is most often run as an after-school extracurricular activity, but some schools offer Science Olympiad classes that allow students to receive academic credit for participation.  A teacher, parent, or student (usually a volunteer) coordinates the team in practice and preparation for the competition.  Often there are others who coach individual events as well.  A team can consist of up to 15 students and any number of alternates; some states allow more students per team.  At the middle school level at nationals, only five ninth graders are allowed to compete on one team; at the high school level, only seven twelfth graders are allowed per team. However, state organizations occasionally amend these rules. Homeschool groups may also form as many teams as they need to compete, provided each team consists only of students residing in, at most, two contiguous counties.

Although teams may have an unlimited number of alternates, it is implicitly stated within the rules that competitors present at the event must have completed all of the work on their event. This is specifically aimed at building events. It is illegal for teams to have their alternates as "builders" and their formal team members as "thinkers". Judges at the event are allowed to ask any question of the machine or contraption in an effort to keep the scenario above from occurring. Nonetheless, competitors, coaches, and entire teams are expected to have integrity and to abide by this rule.

A great deal of strategy usually goes into forming a team. Since events go on at the same time as other events during a competition and conflicts may occur, the coach or coordinator must make decisions based on the competitor's specialty and ability in order to correctly place him/her. Sometimes, usually during the reformation of competitors when a team advances a level, a competitor who wasn't originally planned to compete in a certain event may have to compete in it to fill the certain event slot.

Scoring

The winner of the competition is determined by each team's overall score.  Each school is ranked in every event based on that event's rules. For each type of event, the ranking differs. Knowledge events are scored by the correct number of answers; the team with the highest score will receive 1st place, the second highest will receive 2nd place, and so on. If two teams are tied, there are usually tiebreaker questions that apply only to those teams that are tied. The non-testing events are scored based on the individual requirements listed in the Science Olympiad rule book, released each year to reflect new events, requirements, and clarifications. Some events, such as the knowledge/testing-based will rank teams by using the highest scores. However others may use the lowest score. The team's overall score is then calculated by adding together the rank of the school in all events (e.g. 1st place receives 1 point, 2nd place 2 points, etc.). The team with the lowest overall score is declared the winner. However, some state competitions choose to score the competition by awarding more points per place (e.g. 13 points for 1st place, 12 points for 2nd place, etc.) and having the team with the most points being declared the winner.

There are several ways to break a tie (draw):

 One method for tie-breaking is based on medals where the team with more first place medals wins. If both teams have the same amount of first places, it moves to second place medals and so on. This is the method that the National Tournament uses.
 Before a competition, the event organizer decides on several events to be used as tie-breakers.  If two teams get the same score overall, the team that rates highest in that one event will take the lead.
 A third way of tie-breaking is to use a team's score in trial/pilot events. The team with the best combined score in trial events would win the competition when this method is used.
 In some competitions, there also may questions added into event, labeled as tie-breakers. If needed, these questions can be used as tie breakers, although this type of tie-breaker is generally for only the event and not the overall rank.

Competition levels

Science Olympiad competitions occur at the regional, state and national level.  Normally, the top few teams advance from the regional level to state competition, the exact number depending on how many regions there are and how many teams compete.  For example, in Ohio, the number of teams qualifying for the state tournament from each regional depends solely on the number of teams participating at that regional, whereas in New York the allocation system involved determining whether or not the winning team in a regional tournament had won the previous year (this method has since been discontinued). In most states, the top team advances from the state to the national competition.  Some states with a larger number of teams are allotted a second spot at the national competition to represent their larger participation.  Currently, 120 teams compete at the national level each year (60 from Division B and 60 from Division C); the number has changed over the years to accommodate growing participation.

Many states also hold invitational tournaments. These competitions serve as "practice rounds" for qualifying tournaments, and are hosted by individual middle schools, high schools and/or colleges. Invitationals occur most commonly in January or February, although there have been some as early as October or as late as April. Teams can participate in invitationals from multiple states depending on availability.  At some invitationals, only a few events are held. However, many invitational tournaments mimic regional and state competitions in their competitive intensity. For example, MIT hosts an invitational tournament each year with around 70 teams from over a dozen states, including 20 or more past national qualifiers. Other tournaments, especially in the midwest, are well known for their quality and competitiveness. In this way, teams can gain extra practice before competing in regional, state, or national tournaments. In 2014, Yale University became one of the first institutions of higher education to host a tournament run by Science Olympiad alumni, with several more following over the next few years.

National tournament

The National Science Olympiad competition is held in late May at a different university every year. Teams compete at the state competition with the top two schools in Division B and Division C each earning a spot at the national competition. Some states are given a second slot, based on the membership within the division.  The total number of invited teams in each division is equal to 60 and the national tournament hosts 120 teams. In 2012, at the University of Central Florida, a team from Japan was invited as a Global Ambassador Team. Although they competed in several events, their scores were not tallied against the state teams.

The competition officially begins with opening ceremonies on Friday night that usually include a notable speaker, such as a Nobel Laureate. A traditional Swap Meet follows the opening ceremonies which is an opportunity for teams to meet and greet. They bring state memorabilia to trade with other teams. The most popular items include hats, license plates, T-shirts, and key chains.

Saturday includes several time blocks. Each block includes a 60-minute section for each study event, plus a 15-minute break time for competitors to get from one event to another.

That night, a formal Awards Ceremony is held. It opens with a short speech followed by awarding medals for the top six teams in each event.  Points for all the events are added together to determine an overall national team winner.  The trial events are not included in this tally. The top ten teams in each division are recognized with trophies and plaques.

In some national tournaments, scholarships are awarded to the top teams in each event. For the 2005 and 2010 competitions, held at the University of Illinois Urbana-Champaign, first-place event winners received full four-year tuition waivers to the university. At the 2006 National Tournament, host Indiana University awarded $7,000 annual scholarships to those who finished first place in Division C and who attend the university in their freshman year. The George Washington University offered Division C gold medalists at its 2008 National Tournament a $20,000 stipend for those who were accepted and attended GWU.  In 2012, the University of Central Florida offered $30,000 scholarships to the university for first place medalists in Division C.  Additional awards may also provided by sponsors and industry leaders for specific events. For example, the Centers for Disease Control and Prevention provided first place medalists in Disease Detectives (Divisions B & C) with a trip for the two competitors and their coach to tour its facility in Atlanta, Georgia.

National locations and champions
This is a list of past national champions and locations.

List of National Championships by SchoolDivision B

Division C

List of States by Number of National Tournaments Hosted

Six universities have hosted the National Tournament twice: Michigan State University, Ohio State University, University of Illinois Urbana-Champaign, Indiana University-Bloomington, University of Central Florida, and Wright State University.

Division A
Division A generally covers elementary school students (through 6th grade). Schools which wish to start a Science Olympiad program at their school can take advantage of the resources offered on the National Science Olympiad website.  There is no National membership fee required to participate in Elementary Division activities.  An appropriate program will depend upon the objectives and resources of the local school or community.  Programs can range from a Fun Night to a large competitive tournament.  Some Elementary programs have existed as long as the National program, and have developed additional resources that schools may find helpful.

References

External links
 Official Science Olympiad National Home Page
 Science Olympiad Student Center
 
 Macomb Science Olympiad / Southeast Michigan Region 7 Division B&C, Macomb and St. Clair counties Division A, Website http://MacombSO.org
 Biology Olympiad Student Center

Science competitions
Youth science
Science events in the United States
Education competitions in the United States
Student events
Recurring events established in 1974